The Wollo Oromo people are an Oromo subgroup inhabiting the historic Wollo Province of northern Ethiopia.

Language 
The Wollo Oromo speak an Oromo dialect. However, linguistic descriptions of the Wollo and nearby Raya Oromo areas are still lacking.

Amhara region's Militia attack Wollo Oromo
According to Hassan Hadiya, a resident of Kemise, the conflict started between Wollo Oromo people and Amhara Special Forces after Amhara Special Forces killed an individual at the entrances of the grand mosque in Ataye, Oromia zone of Amhara region.  Ahmed says the Amhara Special Forces are attacking civilians and ongoing a blazing movement. eyewitness evidence blames the Amhara regional special forces while the Amhara regional government accuses both OLF-Shene and TPLF as a scapegoat of the violence.

Two Members of the Ethiopian parliament accused Amhara Liyu police for killing Oromo civilians in Ataye, Oromia zone by labeling them what he called "bread name" which refers to OLF. "Amhara Militia used OLF-Shane as a pretext to commit war crime on Oromo farmers in Wollo for the three major reasons the MP said on 11th Session of parliament of Ethiopia. The reasons are (1) their national identity (being an Oromo), (2) their religious identity (being Muslim), and (3)use the atrocity as a bargaining threat to fulfill all their demands in the Oromia region". 
This violence is common as Oromos have been discriminated by Amharas in Shewa and Wollo for centuries for having ethnic, regional, linguistic, cultural, and religious differences.

See also 
 List of Oromo subgroups and clans
 Oromia Zone

References 

Ethnic groups in Ethiopia
Oromo groups